Camphora parthenoxylon is an evergreen tree in the genus Cinnamomum,  tall. It is native to South and East Asia (Bhutan, Myanmar, Cambodia, China, India, Indonesia, Laos, Malaysia, Nepal, Philippines, Thailand, and Vietnam). In Vietnam, the tree is considered Critically endangered.

In English, C. parthenoxylon is known as Selasian wood, saffrol laurel, or Martaban camphor wood. It has the outdated heterotypic synonym Laurus porrecta (Roxb.). The species name parthenoxylon derives from parthenos xylon, meaning "virgin wood".

Growth

The tree has gray to brown bark.  Its leaves are glossy green ovals 7–10 cm long with a point at the end. Like many plants in the Lauraceae, the leaves give off a pleasant smell when crushed.  The flowers appear in clusters and are green and very small.  The fruits are blackish drupes.

In Indonesia, the flowers of C. parthenoxylon symbolize love and connection between the living and the dead.  Traditionally, in the Kudus Regency on the island of Java, the flowers were scattered on tombs by family members.

Uses

The aromatic bark of the plant is used for flavoring, not unlike many other Cinnamomum species.

The tree is of special concern, as it is being harvested at a high rate to obtain safrole, a precursor to the pesticide synergist piperonyl butoxide, the flavorant and fragrance piperonal, and the psychoactive drug MDMA. Much of this illicit harvesting is happening in the Cardamom Mountains and Botum Sakor National Park in Cambodia at the moment. 
The documentary film "Forest of ecstasy" (Vanguard 2009) is investigating the issue on location.

An extract from the bark has been shown in rats to reduce postprandial hyperglycemia.

Conservation efforts 
In 2004, the Cambodian government classified C. parthenoxylon as a rare species and prohibited any logging of this tree. In addition, the production, import, and export of safrole rich oils has been illegal in Cambodia since 2007.

References

parthenoxylon
Critically endangered flora of Asia
Medicinal plants of Asia
Data deficient plants
Trees of China
Flora of tropical Asia